Kasom Khullen is a village located at the north-eastern state of Manipur in India. The village, about 64 km away from the capital Imphal, is also the headquarter of the Kasom Sub Division situated at the southern region of Kamjong district. The village is inhabited by about 250 households.

Kasom Khullen, like majority of the villages in the district is inhabited by the Tangkhul Naga tribe. Although the village has a different and unique language of its own, the people interacts with other parts of the district by the local Tangkhul dialect

Kasom Khullen boasts a history of culture and tradition, specially characterised by its folk dances.

The village officially adopted Christianity in 1947, but the cultural traditions of the village is still preserved through its folk music, dances, and festival.

Occupation
The main occupation of the village is agriculture, practising Jhum cultivation. The people are simple and has a great work ethic, even though majority of the population is literate. Fishing and hunting also plays an important role in the daily livelihood of the village. Almost every household in the village is equipped with necessary tools and weapons for it.

Festivals
Throughout ages, the village has been taking an active part in preserving the unique culture of the Tangkhul Naga tribe. And apart from the various festivals of the Tangkhul Naga tribe, the village also has its own, notably the Ramtho Phanit and Reiko festival. Ramtho Phanit is the festival which marks the beginning of the agricultural year. Reiko is the festival which is observed whenever the village leads a successful expedition against the enemies in the past. It is observed till this day whenever the village brings laurels and are victorious in Sporting events.

Folk dances
Kasom Khullen is famous for its unique folk dances. The following is the list of events in which the village participated in folk dances:

References

Villages in Ukhrul district